Gualala (Pomo: Qh awála-li) is an unincorporated community in Mendocino County in the U.S. state of California. It is located north of The Sea Ranch and south of Point Arena, California. Gualala shares its southern border with the southern border of Mendocino County.  It is located on the Pacific coast at the mouth of the Gualala River, on State Route 1. It serves as a commercial center for the surrounding area. Gualala was once a logging town, but tourism is now its central economic activity.

Name
Gualala derives from the Kashaya Pomo village name Walaali, which itself is from Qh awála-li, meaning "where the water goes down". Gualala is the Spanish spelling; obsolete English-influenced variants include Walhalla (influenced by Walhalla of Norse mythology), Wallala and Wallholla.

History

Native peoples
The Native peoples who occupied this area were known as the latcupda. They were a small entity of the bokeya group of Pomo peoples.

Mexican era
Though both the Spanish and the Russians attempted to colonize northern California in the early 18th century, few people made incursions into the region until the 1840s. In 1844, Alta California Governor Manuel Micheltorena granted General Rafael Garcia  of land between the Gualala River and Mal Paso Creek. Garcia used the land to graze cattle.  After Mexico was forced to cede California as a result of its loss of the Mexican-American War, the Board of California Land Commissioners examined Garcia's claim to the land under the California Land Act of 1851. The Board invalidated Garcia's claim in 1854 on a technicality. This made Garcia's land available for sale through the United States government as public land.

Lumber
Cyrus D. Robinson and his family were among the first American settlers to build on the lands of the invalidated Garcia land grant. Sources conflict on the exact year of their arrival, but by 1862, he had sold part of the land to Webber and Rutherford so they could build a lumber mill in China Gulch, a small drainage near the mouth of the Gualala River.  The town of Gualala quickly grew to support company operations.  The lumber mills processed redwood trees felled in nearby forests. In 1868, Webber and Rutherford sold to Zemri Heywood and Samuel Harmon. Heywood and Harmon then constructed a second mill on a river flat on a large bend near the mouth of the Gualala River. This mill, informally known as Heywood's Mill, formed the backbone of Gualala's economy for its approximately 40-year tenure. At its peak, the mill produced 175,000 board feet of lumber per day. Heywood's Mill burned down in a fire on September 14, 1906.

In later years, a wide gauge railroad replaced animals as motive power. This railroad is noted as one of the widest-gauge railroads in the United States, measuring 68.5 inches wide. Soon after 1872, Robinson's wire chute gave way to nearby Bourn's Landing (pronounced "bones"), due to the comparatively safer anchorage at that location. The mill company extended the railway to this location, and the area's goods primarily came through this location until automobiles began to render shipping obsolete in the early 1920s.

Town development
In 1861, Cyrus Robinson filed a claim under the Land Act of 1820 for much of the area which is now the town of Gualala. They soon built a hotel, a saloon and a ferry. They also supervised the post office (which was also the stage stop), the Wells Fargo Express and the Western Union.  By the end of the 1800s, Gualala had become a major commercial hub for the entire area, with a dancing school, the Gualala Municipal Brass Band, and an opera house.

The hotel burned down in a fire in 1903.  The hotel was later rebuilt to the south of its original location at a cost of $6,000. In 1907, Mark Pedotti and Antonio Ciapusci bought the Gualala Hotel property which included 636 acres and among them they divided the property with Antonio acquiring the area of Gualala who later died in 1932.  His son George and wife, Ida inherited the land after his death.

Today, tourists come to nearby Sea Ranch, California, for which Gualala provides tourist and commercial services.

Climate
According to the Köppen Climate Classification system, Gualala has a warm-summer Mediterranean climate, abbreviated "Csb" on climate maps.

Government

Education
There were no schools in the area until 1883, when a single-room schoolhouse was constructed with the support of the Heywood family. Until that time, it was a common custom to send children to live with other families in larger areas to attend school.

Elementary school students are educated at Horicon Elementary School in Annapolis in Sonoma County, or Arena Union Elementary in Point Arena. High school students are educated at Point Arena High School.

See also
 Gualala River
 Ranchos of California
 The Sea Ranch

References

External links

 Friends of the Gualala River
 Redwood Coast Chamber of Commerce
 TripAdvisor Travel Information
 Gualala Arts Center
 Town Website

Populated coastal places in California
Unincorporated communities in California
Unincorporated communities in Mendocino County, California
Logging communities in the United States
California ranchos
1861 establishments in California